Height of the Rockies Provincial Park is a provincial park in the Canadian Rockies of south eastern British Columbia, Canada. It is located west of the Continental Divide (in this region, the British Columbia/Alberta Border), adjacent to Elk Lakes Provincial Park.

Description and access
The park comprises  in East Kootenay on the western side of the Continental Divide, which in this region forms the border between British Columbia and Alberta. It borders Elk Lakes Provincial Park, also in British Columbia, to which it is linked by a trail, and Banff National Park and Peter Lougheed Provincial Park in Alberta. The park lies east of Invermere; the closest communities are Elkford to the south and Canal Flats and Radium Hot Springs to the west. The park is accessible on foot or horseback via logging roads and trails to 6 trailheads. All mechanized access is forbidden, and there are no campgrounds or other park services in the park. The Great Divide Trail passes through the park.

The park is an Alpine environment with forested bottomland. It includes several lakes, the Palliser River valley, the Middle Fork of the White River, and the Royal Group of mountains. The highest peak, Mount Joffre, is on the border with Alberta. There are seven important mountain passes.

Wildlife
The park is important habitat for wildlife, in particular grizzly bears, and also contains large numbers of black bears, moose, mule deer, bighorn sheep, timber wolves, and cougars. There are more than 2,000 elk and one of the highest densities of mountain goats in the world. Cutthroat trout are plentiful in many lakes and streams and are taken from the park for the Kootenay native species stocking program. Hunting, trapping, and fishing are permitted at controlled levels.

The park is at one end of the Southern Rocky Mountain Management Plan, aimed at coordinating ecosystem preservation and providing wildlife corridors, in particular for grizzly bears. Also to provide more comprehensive protection of the environment and wildlife habitat, British Columbia has considered asking the United Nations to add Height of the Rockies and 5 other provincial parks to the Canadian Rocky Mountain Parks World Heritage Site.

History
The passes through what is now the park were used by the Kootenai Indians and by mid-19th-century European explorers. Two archaeological sites over 8,000 years old have been identified on the Middle Fork of the White River.

A national park was proposed early in the 20th century. In 1936 the White River Game Reserve was established. However, construction of logging roads and clearcutting became so extensive in the Southern Canadian Rockies that by 1986, the area that is now the park had become the last major refuge for wildlife in the region. Two provincial environmental organisations, BC Spaces for Nature and the Palliser Wilderness Society, with guide outfitter Hiram Cody Tegart, led a campaign to protect it permanently by making it a wilderness park, and in 1987, after a twelve-year process of negotiation between government, conservationists, hunting guides and outfitters, and logging companies, it became the first Forest Wilderness Area in British Columbia. In 1995 it became a Class A Provincial Park. It was part of the Kootenays regional plan, which created 16 new provincial parks and sought to protect both logging jobs and wilderness areas.

See also
Continental Ranges

References

Further reading
 Appendix 3 in: British Columbia Round Table on the Environment and the Economy. Dispute Resolution Core Group. Reaching Agreement Volume 1 Consensus Processes in British Columbia. Vancouver: Round Table, 1991. .

External links
 Height of the Rockies brochure from campaign to save the area, The Palliser Wilderness Society

Provincial parks of British Columbia
Provincial and state parks in the Rocky Mountains
Parks in the Regional District of East Kootenay
Parks in the Canadian Rockies
1995 establishments in British Columbia
Protected areas established in 1995